Daniel Bowker (born 21 September 1987) is an Australian canoeist. He competed in the men's K-2 200 metres event at the 2016 Summer Olympics.

References

External links
 

1987 births
Living people
Australian male canoeists
Olympic canoeists of Australia
Canoeists at the 2016 Summer Olympics
Sportspeople from Perth, Western Australia
21st-century Australian people